Benson station is a train station in Benson, Arizona. It is served by Amtrak's Sunset Limited and Texas Eagle, which pass through Benson 3 days a week in each direction. There are no facilities for Amtrak passengers other than a small metal shelter. The nearby Southern Pacific Railroad Depot replica building has been used as a tourist information center. The building is also the location of bus stops for Benson Area Transit and Greyhound.

The station is a flag stop, served only when passengers have tickets to and from the station.

References

External links

 Benson Amtrak station information

 Benson Amtrak Station (USA Rail Guide – Train Web)

Buildings and structures in Cochise County, Arizona
Amtrak stations in Arizona
Transportation in Cochise County, Arizona
Former Southern Pacific Railroad stations
Benson, Arizona